Pyeongdong station is a station of Gwangju Metro Line 1 in Woljeon-dong, Gwangsan District, Gwangju, South Korea. It is located near at the Okdong Vehicle Office in Pyeong-dong. This station is only a ground section. In the middle of the night, the five formations are rushing at Okdong Station.

Station layout

External links
  Cyber station information from Gwangju Metropolitan Rapid Transit Corporation
  Cyber station information from Gwangju Metropolitan Rapid Transit Corporation

Gwangju Metro stations
Gwangsan District
Railway stations opened in 2008